Minjung (민중) is a Korean political term referring to marginalised people of society.

Minjung may also refer to:
Minjung of Goguryeo (민중, fl. 40s), fourth ruler of Goguryeo
Min-jung (name) (민정), the tenth-most-common name in South Korea
Minjung Party (People's Party), a political party in South Korea established in 2017

See also
Minjung theology
Minjung art